Place de la République is a square in Paris.

Place de la République may also refer to:
 Place de la République, Lyon
 Place de la République, Strasbourg

See also
Náměstí Republiky (disambiguation)
Praça da República (disambiguation)
Platz der Republik (disambiguation)
Plaza de la República (disambiguation)
Piazza della Repubblica (disambiguation)
Republic Square (disambiguation)